Hotchkiss is an unincorporated community in northern Alberta under the jurisdiction of the County of Northern Lights.

Localities in the County of Northern Lights